Robert Lyall Lucas  (20 February 1927, Bedford, Bedfordshire, UK – 5 January 2009, Oxford, Oxfordshire, UK) was a British mycologist, botanist, and phytopathologist. He was the president of the British Mycological Society for one year from 1976 to 1977.

Biography
After secondary education at Bedford School, Lucas attended New College, Oxford, where he graduated with a B.A. in botany in 1949 and an M.A. in 1952. On 28 June 1952 he married Pamela Widdowson. He was admitted to King's College, Cambridge, where he studied fungi that infect plant roots and graduated with a Ph.D. in 1953.

At the University of Oxford, Lucas was a Demonstrator in the department of agriculture from 1952 to 1953, a University Lecturer from 1953 to 1955, and a lecturer in agriculture in New College Oxford from 1955 until his retirement in 1992. He was appointed in 1965 a Senior Rsearch Fellow at Keble College, Oxford and in 1975 a Tutorial Fellow in biological sciences. Throughout his career, he was often consulted to identify wild fungi. Following the retirement of the Oxford chemist G. D. Parkes in 1967, Lucas served for more than 20 years as Curator of the University Parks. During his curatorship he dealt with Dutch elm disease, the Great Storm of 1987, and the abolition in 1991 of Parson's Pleasure.

Lucas chaired the University of Oxford's Delegacy for Local Examinations from 1981 to 1990. During those years he made visits to China and Trinidad as an advisor on the development of new examinations and to Oman as a consultant on the development of Sultan Qaboos University. In 1988 he administered the closing of the University of Oxford's agricultural department in its merger with the departments of forestry and plant sciences. He was in 1968–1969 one of the four Pro-Proctors who served under the Senior Proctor. Lucas served from 1971 to 1973 as Curator of the University of Oxford Botanic Garden and subsequently as Garden Master from 1984 to 1987.

In 1969 he was made MBE. In recognition of his curatorship of the University Parks, the University of Oxford created Lucas Walk in his memory.

His wife Pamela was for many years a churchwarden at the Church of St Nicholas, Old Marston. He assisted her in church affairs and was an active church member for more than 45 years. Upon his death in 2009 he was survived by his widow, their son and daughter, and ﬁve grandchildren.

Selected publications

References

1927 births
2009 deaths
20th-century British botanists
21st-century British botanists
British mycologists
British phytopathologists
People educated at Bedford School
Alumni of New College, Oxford
Alumni of King's College, Cambridge
Academics of the University of Oxford
Members of the Order of the British Empire
Presidents of the British Mycological Society